Bluff City is a city in Harper County, Kansas, United States.  As of the 2020 census, the population of the city was 45.

History
Bluff City was founded about 1879. The community took its name from Bluff Creek, which flows past it.

Bluff City was a station and shipping point on the Kansas Southwestern Railway.

Geography
Bluff City is located at  (37.075671, -97.875376).

Climate
The climate in this area is characterized by hot, humid summers and generally mild to cool winters.  According to the Köppen Climate Classification system, Bluff City has a humid subtropical climate, abbreviated "Cfa" on climate maps.

Demographics

2010 census
As of the census of 2010, there were 65 people, 29 households, and 13 families residing in the city. The racial makeup of the city was 100.0% White.

There were 29 households, of which 24.1% had children under the age of 18 living with them, 37.9% were married couples living together, 3.4% had a female householder with no husband present, 3.4% had a male householder with no wife present, and 55.2% were non-families. 37.9% of all households were made up of individuals, and 10.3% had someone living alone who was 65 years of age or older. The average household size was 2.24 and the average family size was 3.15.

The median age in the city was 42.8 years. 23.1% of residents were under the age of 18; 3% were between the ages of 18 and 24; 32.2% were from 25 to 44; 27.7% were from 45 to 64; and 13.8% were 65 years of age or older. The gender makeup of the city was 55.4% male and 44.6% female.

2000 census
As of the census of 2000, there were 80 people, 32 households, and 23 families residing in the city. The racial makeup of the city was 100.00% White.

There were 32 households, out of which 31.3% had children under the age of 18 living with them, 65.6% were married couples living together, and 28.1% were non-families. 21.9% of all households were made up of individuals, and 12.5% had someone living alone who was 65 years of age or older. The average household size was 2.50 and the average family size was 3.00.

In the city, the population was spread out, with 22.5% under the age of 18, 3.8% from 18 to 24, 25.0% from 25 to 44, 26.3% from 45 to 64, and 22.5% who were 65 years of age or older. The median age was 44 years. For every 100 females, there were 122.2 males. For every 100 females age 18 and over, there were 113.8 males.

The median income for a household in the city was $20,625, and the median income for a family was $31,458. Males had a median income of $28,750 versus $10,417 for females. The per capita income for the city was $10,030. There were 13.3% of families and 12.7% of the population living below the poverty line, including no under eighteens and 50.0% of those over 64.

Education
The community is served by Chaparral USD 361 public school district.

Bluff City High School was closed through school unification. The Bluff City High School mascot was Tigers.

References

Further reading

External list
 Bluff City - Directory of Public Officials
 Bluff City map, KDOT

Cities in Kansas
Cities in Harper County, Kansas